Winona is a national historic district located at Norfolk, Virginia. It encompasses 203 contributing buildings in a small, cohesive residential neighborhood just north of Lafayette Residence Park in Norfolk. It was platted in 1909, and largely developed between 1916 and 1941.  There are notable examples of Queen Anne and Colonial Revival style residential architecture.

It was listed on the National Register of Historic Places in 2001.

References

Houses on the National Register of Historic Places in Virginia
Historic districts on the National Register of Historic Places in Virginia
National Register of Historic Places in Norfolk, Virginia
Colonial Revival architecture in Virginia
Queen Anne architecture in Virginia
Neighborhoods in Norfolk, Virginia
Houses in Norfolk, Virginia
1909 establishments in Virginia